United Nations Security Council resolution 798, adopted unanimously on 18 December 1992, after reaffirming 770 (1992) and 771 (1992) and supporting an initiative by the European Council.The Council condemned reports of the massive, organized and systematic detention and rape of women, in particular Muslim women, in Bosnia and Herzegovina during the Bosnian War.

The Council further demanded all detention camps be closed, requesting the Secretary-General to provide support to enable the European Community delegations to have free and secure access to the places of detention, further requesting a report within 15 days of the passing of the current resolution.

Resolution 798 was the first time the United Nations had condemned the rape of women in wartime.

See also
 Breakup of Yugoslavia
 Bosnian Genocide
 Bosnian War
 Croatian War of Independence
 List of United Nations Security Council Resolutions 701 to 800 (1991–1993)
 Yugoslav Wars

References

External links
 
Text of the Resolution at undocs.org

 0798
 0798
Bosnian War
1992 in Bosnia and Herzegovina
1992 in Croatia
1992 in Yugoslavia
 0798
December 1992 events